This is a list of plants that are native to the U.S. state of Michigan.

A
Acalypha rhomboidea, Rhombic copperleaf
Acalypha virginica, Virginia copperleaf
Acorus americanus, American sweet-flag
Amaranthus arenicola, Sandhill amaranth
Amaranthus retroflexus, Rough pigweed
Ambrosia artemisiifolia, Common ragweed
Ambrosia trifida, Giant ragweed
Anchusa officinalis, Common bugloss
Andersonglossum virginianum, Blue hound's-tongue
Aplectrum hyemale, Putty-root
Aquilegia canadensis, Wild columbine
Arisaema dracontium, Green dragon
Arisaema triphyllum, Jack-in-the-pulpit
Aristolochia macrophylla, Dutchman's pipe
Aristolochia serpentaria, Virginia snakeroot
Artemisia campestris, Field sagewort
Artemisia vulgaris, Mugwort
Asarum canadense, Wild ginger
Asclepias viridiflora, Green milkweed
Atriplex littoralis, Grass-leaved orache
Atriplex patula, Halberd-leaved orache
Atriplex prostrata, Triangle orache

B
Barbarea vulgaris, Bittercress
Bassia scoparia, Summer cypress
Boehmeria cylindrica, False nettle

C
Cakile edentula, Sea-rocket
Campanula aparinoides, Marsh bellflower
Campanula glomerata, Clustered bellflower
Campanula rapunculoides, Creeping bellflower
Campanula rotundifolia, Harebell
Campanula trachelium, Nettle-leaved bellflower
Campanulastrum americanum, Tall bellflower
Caulophyllum thalictroides, Blue cohosh
Chaenorhinum minus, Lesser toadflax
Chenopodium album, Lamb's quarters
Chamaesyce polygonifolia, Seaside spurge
Coeloglossum viride, Frog orchid
Commelina communis, Common Dayflower
Commelina erecta, Erect dayflower
Cycloloma atriplicifolium, Winged pigweed
Cypripedium acaule, Pink lady's slipper

D
Dioscorea villosa, Wild yam
Dysphania ambrosioides, Mexican-tea

E
Echium vulgare, Viper's bugloss
Epifagus virginiana, Beech-drops
Euphorbia cyparissias, Cypress spurge
Euphorbia esula, Leafy spurge
Euphorbia commutata, Tinted spurge

F
Floerkea proserpinacoides, False mermaid
Fragaria virginiana, Virginia strawberry

G
Galium circaezans, Forest bedstraw
Galium odoratum, Sweet woodruff
Gentiana andrewsii, Prairie closed gentian
Gentiana puberulenta, Prairie gentian
Gentiana saponaria, Soapwort gentian
Gentianopsis crinita, Greater fringed gentian

H
Humulus lupulus, Common hops
Hybanthus concolor, Green violet

I

J

K

L
Lappula squarrosa, Stickseed
Lechea mucronata, Hairy pinweed
Linum perenne, Blue flax
Liparis liliifolia, Large twayblade
Lithospermum caroliniense, Carolina puccoon
Ludwigia palustris, Water purslane

M
Maianthemum stellatum, Starry false Solomon's seal
Malaxis monophyllos, White adder's-tongue
Mertensia paniculata, Northern bluebell
Mertensia virginica, Virginia bluebell
Mitella nuda, Naked mitrewort
Myosotis arvensis, Field forget-me-not
Myosotis discolor, Changing Forget-me-not
Myosotis laxa, Small forget-me-not
Myosotis scorpioides, True forget-me-not
Myosotis stricta, Strict forget-me-not
Myosotis sylvatica, Garden forget-me-not
Myriophyllum heterophyllum, Water-milfoil

N
Neottia auriculata, Auricled twayblade
Neottia cordata, Heart-leaved twayblade

O

P
Parietaria pensylvanica, Pellitory
Peltandra virginica, Arrow-arum
Phlox divaricata, Wild blue phlox
Platanthera aquilonis, Tall northern bog-orchid
Platanthera clavellata, Green woodland orchid
Platanthera flava, Tubercled orchid
Platanthera hookeri, Hooker's orchid
Platanthera lacera, Ragged fringed orchid
Polygonatum biflorum, Smooth Solomon's seal
Polygonatum pubescens, Hairy Solomon's seal
Potamogeton crispus, Curled pondweed
Potamogeton diversifolius, Common snailseed pondweed
Potamogeton epihydrus, Ribbon-leaved pondweed
Potamogeton gramineus, Variable pondweed
Potamogeton natans, Floating pondweed
Potentilla indica, Mock strawberry
Proserpinaca palustris, Common mermaid-weed
Pterospora andromedea, Pine-drops

Q

R
Rumex acetosella, Sheep's sorrel
Rumex crispus, Curled dock
Rumex obtusifolius, Bitter dock
Rumex verticillatus, Water dock

S
Scleranthus annuus, Knawel
Scrophularia lanceolata, American figwort
Scrophularia marilandica, Eastern figwort
Silene latifolia, White campion
Smilax herbacea, Carrion-flower
Smilax rotundifolia, Common greenbriar
Stuckenia pectinata, Sago pondweed
Symplocarpus foetidus, Eastern skunk cabbage

T
Taraxacum officinale, Common dandelion
Tradescantia bracteata, Sticky spiderwort
Tradescantia ohiensis, Smooth spiderwort
Tradescantia virginiana, Virginia spiderwort
Triodanis perfoliata, Venus's looking-glass
Trillium recurvatum, Prairie trillium
Trillium sessile, Toad trillium

U
Urtica dioica, Stinging nettle

V
Vicia cracca, Tufted vetch
Vincetoxicum nigrum, Black swallow-wort
Viola adunca, Hook-spurred violet
Viola bicolor, Wild pansy
Viola labradorica, American dog violet
Viola rostrata, Long-spurred violet
Viola tricolor, Johnny-jump-up

W

X
Xanthium strumarium, Common cocklebur

Z

References

 Flowers
Michigan
.
Flora